is a Japanese manga series written and illustrated by Shō Aimoto. It has been serialized in Shueisha's shōnen manga magazine Jump Square since December 2016 and has been collected in eighteen tankōbon volumes as of February 2023. An anime television series adaptation produced by Ajia-do Animation Works aired from January to March 2021.

Characters

A 13-year-old ghoul-human hanyo or hybrid. After being supposedly abandoned by his parents, he was abused by his aunt as hard labour for her inn, earning him the nickname "Dorotabo" as he was always covered in dirt and smelling badly from toiling in the fields. Kabane later learns from Inugami that he was likely not abandoned due to being in possession of the Life Calculus, which quenches his ghoulish thirst for flesh, and begins searching for his parents while learning more about his emotions along the way. Kabane possesses an innocent and straightforward personality, as well as an extremely self-sacrificial spirit. Owing to his immortality as a bloodless ghoul and ability to regenerate provided his head remains intact, he often puts himself in the line of fire for his friends. Apart from regeneration, his ghoul blood also gifts him incredible strength. Believing his parents' bodies to have been the vessels for the Calculi, he begins collecting all the other Calculi and combining them. 
 

A tanuki known as "the Kemonoist" that runs the Inugami Strangeness Consultancy Office. While he appears carefree and frivolous at times, he is frighteningly perceptive and is a powerful Kemono, being able to use strong illusion spells, summon guns and harden his body to steel. Inugami strongly believes in coexistence between Kemono and humans. He currently takes care of Kabane, Shiki and Akira, and houses Mihai.
 

A 15-year-old yukionoko from Aomori. As a descendant of yukionna, he has the ability to freeze objects provided there is water around, manipulate snow and ice, and withstand very cold temperatures. He came to Tokyo hoping Inugami could help him find his older twin brother, Yui, whom he escaped their village with. Despite being a boy, Akira is extremely feminine and enjoys girlish, cute things and posting on social media. Because of his hate for disgusting things and tendency to faint from fear, he mainly takes care of domestic affairs in the office. Even so, Akira is often able to pull his weight for the others in a pinch, later unlocking a hidden power of the yukionokos.
 

A 14-year-old Arachne-human hanyo who had been passed into Inugami's custody by his uncle. He is a tsundere, often brash and rude with his friends but making sure to take good care of them at the same time. Out of all the three children, he is the most rational and level-headed. Shiki fights by producing thread from his sweat and spit, and manipulating their qualities to become stickier or harder, though this dehydrates him after some time. With Inugami and Kabane's help, Shiki manages to reunite with his mother and younger sister Aya.
 

An immortal vampire that lives as a shut-in in Inugami's house, living out his countless days by playing video games. Owing to his many years of life, he is in a constant state of boredom and has mastered almost every skill there is, including cooking and sewing. He mainly specialises in communication technology and hacking, and so manages the agency's online affairs. While narcissistic and arrogant, he helps the agency out with his best efforts. 

A female kitsune. Under the public eye, she is the superintendent of the Shinjuku police force, but that position is mainly used as her foothold in human society. Although she used to work with Inugami on managing human and Kemono-related issues, she admits that while Inugami seeks for coexistence, she seeks to control humans and preside as the queen over the country someday. She breaks off her relations with Inugami upon realising the existence of the Calculi, and begin plotting ways to steal them from Kemono tribes all over Japan. Inari is manipulative, selfish, vain and extremely hot-tempered to the point of being ruthless. She later assembles a private force of fellow kitsune to steal the Calculi, intending to combine them into one for herself. 

A young kitsune girl who is also Inari's loyal follower, viewing the latter as a mother-figure. Unlike most kitsune, she is unable to hide her ears through illusion spells, and does so under her hood instead. Stemming from a need to be the most important and a "good girl", she serves Inari with complete admiration, unaware that she is simply being used. Kon fights by discharging fire from her tail and striking with her claws. She later comes to like Kabane and leaves Inari's side. She later regains memories blocked and muddied by Inari, about how Inari killed and devoured her entire clan, keeping only her alive with her memories altered to wait until she would grown stronger.

A kitsune boy who replaces Kon after she fails her mission. He appears to be extremely loyal under Inari, but secretly despises her, often secretly taking actions without her orders. He hides his ears under a pair of headphones. Despite taking on the appearance of a 13-year-old, he is actually 19 years old. Nobimaru has a crafty and intelligent personality able to rival Inugami's, and is extremely capable with both fire and illusion spells. He becomes the head of Inari's private kitsune force later on.

Media

Manga
Kemono Jihen is written and illustrated by Shō Aimoto. The series has been serialized in Shueisha's shōnen manga magazine Jump Square since December 2, 2016. Shueisha has collected its chapters into individual tankōbon volumes. The first volume was released on March 3, 2017. As of February 3, 2023, eighteen volumes have been released. The manga is licensed in English by Seven Seas Entertainment.

Anime
An anime television series adaptation was announced at the Jump Festa '20 event on December 21, 2019. The series is animated by Ajia-do Animation Works and directed by Masaya Fujimori, with Noboru Kimura handling series composition, and Nozomi Tachibana designing the characters. The series aired from January 10 to March 28, 2021, on Tokyo MX, ytv, and BS11. Funimation licensed the series and is streaming it on its website in North America and the British Isles, in Europe through Wakanim, and in Australia and New Zealand through AnimeLab. Following Sony's acquisition of Crunchyroll, the series was moved to Crunchyroll. Muse Communication has acquired the series in Southeast Asia and South Asia, and is streaming it on their Muse Asia YouTube channel, and Bilibili in Southeast Asia. The opening theme song is  performed by Daisuke Ono, and the ending theme song is  performed by Sayaka Sasaki.

Reception
In 2018, the manga was ranked 13th in the print category of the Next Manga Awards.

References

External links
Manga official website 
Anime official website 

2021 anime television series debuts
Ajia-do Animation Works
Anime series based on manga
Dark fantasy anime and manga
Crunchyroll anime
Muse Communication
Mystery anime and manga
Seven Seas Entertainment titles
Shōnen manga
Shueisha manga
Supernatural anime and manga
Tokyo MX original programming